Dame Parmjit Kaur "Bobbie" Cheema-Grubb DBE (born Parmjit-kaur Cheema; 6 October 1966), styled The Hon. Mrs Justice Cheema-Grubb, is a judge of the King's Bench Division of the High Court of Justice of England and Wales. She is the first Asian woman to serve as a High Court judge in the United Kingdom.

Early life and education
Parmjit-kaur Cheema was born to Indian Sikh Punjabi parents who came to the United Kingdom  from India in the 1960s. She grew up in Leeds, and attended City of Leeds School before studying law at King's College London.

Legal career
Cheema-Grubb was called to the bar in 1989 by Gray's Inn. In 2006, she became the first Asian woman to be appointed a Junior Treasury Counsel. In 2007, she became a recorder.

In 2013, she was appointed Queen's Counsel (QC). She served as a Senior Treasury Counsel and was authorised to sit as a deputy High Court judge. She chaired an Advocacy Training Council working group that produced the report "Raising the Bar: The Handling of Vulnerable Witnesses, Victims and Defendants in Court".

Cheema-Grubb successfully acted for the prosecution against retired Church of England bishop Peter Ball for sexual abuse and against barrister and recorder Constance Briscoe for perverting the course of justice.

Judiciary
On 22 October 2015, Cheema-Grubb's appointment as a High Court judge was announced. She was sworn in on 25 November 2015.

Personal life
In 1990, she married Russell Grubb and they have three children. She is a practising Christian.

See also
David Fuller
2017 Finsbury Park attack

References

1966 births
Living people
Alumni of King's College London
Associates of King's College London
Members of Gray's Inn
21st-century English judges
British people of Indian descent
British people of Punjabi descent
People educated at Leeds City Academy
Queen's Bench Division judges
Dames Commander of the Order of the British Empire
English women judges
Lawyers from Leeds